The Kentucky Cup Classic Stakes is an American Thoroughbred horse race run annually in late September as part of Kentucky Cup Day at Turfway Park in the Cincinnati, Ohio suburb of Florence, Kentucky. A Grade II event for three-year-olds and up, the Kentucky Cup Classic currently offers a purse of $170,000 and is set at a distance of  miles on the dirt.

With the support of WinStar Farm, this race was suspended in 2010 due to economic challenges, but returned in 2011.

On August 29, 2017, after having not been run since its "revival" in 2011, general manager Daniel "Chip" Bach announced the Kentucky Cup Classic would return once again in 2018. The race was run on the Spiral Stakes undercard.

In 2020, Nun the Less, a gelding son of Candy Ride, became the first horse to win the race twice, having won it the first time the previous year. He also became the oldest horse to win the race, winning in 2020 at age 8. Future Prospect, a son of Giant's Causeway's full-brother Freud, had previously been the oldest horse to win, having won in 2011 at age 7.

Records
Time record
 1:47.43 - Atticus (1996)

Most wins by an owner
 2 - Michael Tabor (1995, 2006)
2 - Crystal Racing Enterprises and Contreras Stable, Inc. (2019, 2020)

Most wins by a jockey
 3 - Pat Day (1994, 1998, 2003)

Most wins by a trainer
 3 - Bob Baffert (1997, 1998, 2000)
2 - Cipriano Contreras (2019, 2020)

Most wins by a horse

 2 - Nun the Less (2019, 2020)

Winners of the Kentucky Cup Classic Stakes

References

 The Kentucky Cup Classic Stakes at Pedigree Query
 Official website for Turfway Park
 Kentucky Cup Stakes restored by WinStar Farm

Graded stakes races in the United States
Open mile category horse races
Turfway Park horse races
Recurring sporting events established in 1994
1994 establishments in Kentucky